Dominik Farnbacher (born 26 September 1984 in Ansbach) is a German sports car racing driver, and currently an SRT factory driver, driving an SRT Viper GTS-R in the Tudor United SportsCar Championship.

Career
After beginning his career in karting, Farnbacher competed in Formula BMW Junior in 2001, finishing 9th in the championship.  He then moved to sports car racing, participating in Porsche Carrera Cup Germany, at first for his father's team, Farnbacher Racing; he also participated in the 2004 Porsche Supercup season.

In 2005, Farnbacher co-drove for Farnbacher Racing to win the GT class in the 24 Hours of Daytona. In 2006, Farnbacher drove in the Le Mans Series for Seikel Motorsport in the GT2 class.  He also made his debut in the American Le Mans Series, driving at the 12 Hours of Sebring and Petit Le Mans, and participated in his first 24 Hours of Le Mans, finishing 2nd in class. Farnbacher raced in the full ALMS season in 2007, driving a Porsche for Tafel Racing.  He also ran in the Super GT series in Japan, taking two wins in the GT300 class at Motegi and Fuji.  2008 saw Farnbacher finish 2nd in the GT2 drivers' championship for Tafel, winning four races.

In 2009 Farnbacher switched to Team PTG, driving a Panoz Esperante.  He also won the Okayama 1000 Kilometers.  Farnbacher won the SP7 class of the 2010 24 Hours Nürburgring with co-drivers Allan Simonsen, Leh Keen, and Marco Seefried. Farnbacher also finished 2nd in GT2 at Le Mans with Simonsen and Keen.  He spent 2011 in the ADAC GT Masters series in Germany.  Late in 2012, Farnbacher began racing the SRT Viper; he ran with SRT Motorsports for the full 2013 ALMS season, and remained with the team in the merged United SportsCar Championship in 2014.

Motorsports career results

24 Hours of Le Mans

24 Hours of Daytona 
(key)

IMSA WeatherTech SportsCar Championship series results

* Season still in progress

References

External links

Dominik Farnbacher career statistics at DriverDB.com

Living people
1984 births
People from Ansbach
Sportspeople from Middle Franconia
Racing drivers from Bavaria
24 Hours of Le Mans drivers
24 Hours of Daytona drivers
WeatherTech SportsCar Championship drivers
American Le Mans Series drivers
European Le Mans Series drivers
Asian Le Mans Series drivers
FIA World Endurance Championship drivers
Super GT drivers
ADAC GT Masters drivers
24 Hours of Spa drivers
International GT Open drivers
Extreme Speed Motorsports drivers
AF Corse drivers
FIA GT Championship drivers
Nürburgring 24 Hours drivers
Porsche Carrera Cup Germany drivers